List of Czechs by net worth is regularly compiled by various Czech media, like Euro magazine, Czech edition of the Forbes, server motejlek.com or earlier the newsmagazine Týden. Slovaks are sometimes included in the lists, as Slovak businessmen often live or do business in the Czech Republic. The following list aggregates figures from several sources and doesn't include Slovaks doing its business only in Slovakia.

Notes

References

Lists of people by wealth

Economy of the Czech Republic-related lists
Net worth